Lorrie Moore (born Marie Lorena Moore; January 13, 1957) is an American writer, critic, and essayist. She is best known for her short stories, some of which have won major awards. Since 1984, she has also taught creative writing.

Biography

Marie Lorena Moore was born in Glens Falls, New York, and nicknamed "Lorrie" by her parents. She attended St. Lawrence University. At 19, she won Seventeen magazine's fiction contest. The story, "Raspberries," was published in January 1977. After graduating from St. Lawrence, she moved to Manhattan and worked as a paralegal for two years.

In 1980, Moore enrolled in Cornell University's M.F.A. program, where she was taught by Alison Lurie. Upon graduation from Cornell, Moore was encouraged by a teacher to contact literary agent Melanie Jackson, who agreed to take her as a client. In 1983, Jackson sold Moore’s collection Self-Help, almost entirely stories from her master's thesis, to Knopf.

Works

Short stories
Her short story collections are Self-Help (1985), Like Life, the New York Times bestseller Birds of America, and Bark. She has contributed to The Paris Review. Her first story to appear in The New Yorker, "You're Ugly, Too," was later included in The Best American Short Stories of the Century, edited by John Updike.  Another story, "People Like That Are the Only People Here," also published in The New Yorker, was reprinted in the 1998 edition of the annual collection The Best American Short Stories; the tale of a young child falling sick, the piece was loosely patterned on events in Moore's own life. The story was also included in the 2005 anthology Children Playing Before a Statue of Hercules, edited by David Sedaris.

Moore's Collected Stories was published by Faber in the UK in May 2008. It included all the stories in each of her previously published collections, excerpts from her novel Anagrams, and three previously uncollected stories first published in The New Yorker.

Moore's latest collection, Bark, was published in 2014. It became a finalist of the The Story Prize and was short-listed by Frank O'Connor International Short Story Award.

Novels
Moore's novels are Anagrams (1986), Who Will Run the Frog Hospital? (1994), and A Gate at the Stairs (2009). Anagrams with its experimental form received rather cold critical response. Who Will Run the Frog Hospital is the story of a woman vacationing with her husband who recalls an intense friendship from her adolescence. A Gate at the Stairs takes place just after the September 11 attack and is about a 20-year-old Midwestern woman's coming of age.

Children's books
Moore has written a children's book entitled The Forgotten Helper, about an elf whom Santa Claus mistakenly leaves behind at the home of the worst child on his "good" list.  The elf must help the child be good for the coming year so Santa will return next Christmas.

Essays
Moore writes occasionally about books, films, and television for The New York Review of Books. A collection of her essays, criticism and comment was published by Knopf as See What Can Be Done in April 2018.

Academic career
Moore was the Delmore Schwartz Professor in the Humanities at the University of Wisconsin–Madison, where she taught creative writing for 30 years. She joined the faculty there in 1984 and left to join the faculty at Vanderbilt University in the fall of 2013, where she is now the Gertrude Conaway Vanderbilt Professor of English.

She has also taught at Cornell University, as the Sidney Harman Writer-in-Residence at Baruch College, and at the MFA in Creative Writing program at the University of Michigan, as well as at Princeton and NYU.

Bibliography

Short stories
 1985 – Self-Help; 
 1990 – Like Life; 
 1998 – Birds of America; 
 2008 – The Collected Stories; 
 2014 – Bark; 
 2020 – Collected Stories;

Novels
 1986 – Anagrams; 
 1994 – Who Will Run the Frog Hospital?; 
 2009 – A Gate at the Stairs; 
 2023 - I Am Homeless If This Is Not My Home;

Children's books
 1987 – The Forgotten Helper;

Non-fiction 

2018 – See What Can Be Done;

Awards
Moore won the 1998 O. Henry Award for her short story "People Like That Are the Only People Here," published in The New Yorker on January 27, 1997. In 1999, Moore was named as the winner of The Irish Times International Fiction Prize for Birds of America. In 2004, she was selected as winner of the Rea Award for the Short Story, for outstanding achievement in that genre.

She was elected to the American Academy of Arts and Letters in 2006, and is a fellow of the Wisconsin Academy of Sciences, Arts & Letters. In 2008, she delivered Oxford University's annual Esmond Harmsworth Lecture in American Arts and Letters at the university's Rothermere American Institute. Her 2009 novel, A Gate at the Stairs, was a finalist for the 2010 PEN/Faulkner Award for Fiction and for the Orange Prize for Fiction. Bark was shortlisted for the 2014 Frank O'Connor International Short Story Award and was a finalist for The Story Prize.

References

External links
"About Lorrie Moore: A Profile" Ploughshares (Fall 1998)
Salon interview (1998)

The Believer interview (2005)
Interview with Lorrie Moore, Lewis Burke Frumkes Radio Show (October 2009)
Interview for KCRW's Bookworm (October 22, 2009)
“Words, Wit, & Wild Hearts: A Conversation with Author Lorrie Moore”, On Wisconsin (Spring 2010)
Moore's essays for The New York Review of Books
Archive of Moore's writings for The New Yorker

1957 births
20th-century American novelists
21st-century American novelists
American women novelists
American women short story writers
Cornell University alumni
Living people
Members of the American Academy of Arts and Letters
O. Henry Award winners
PEN/Malamud Award winners
People from Glens Falls, New York
University of Wisconsin–Madison faculty
Vanderbilt University faculty
University of Michigan faculty
20th-century American women writers
21st-century American women writers
20th-century American short story writers
21st-century American short story writers
PEN/Faulkner Award for Fiction winners
Novelists from New York (state)
Novelists from Michigan
Novelists from Tennessee
Novelists from Wisconsin
American women academics